Paracontias ampijoroensis is a species of skinks. It is endemic to Madagascar.

References

Paracontias
Reptiles described in 2016
Reptiles of Madagascar